Merfyn ap Rhodri (died ) was a late 9th-century Aberffraw prince of Gwynedd. He is sometimes credited with ruling Powys after the death of his father Rhodri the Great in AD 878. In the accounts where he is credited as a king, he is reported to have lost his realm to an invasion by his brother Cadell, King of Ceredigion. Merfyn's death may be connected to the incursion into Anglesey by the Viking Ingimundr in the first decade of the 10th century.

The drowning of his son Haearnddur, or "Haardur", was reported by both the Chronicle of the Princes and the Annals of Wales. The first places it in the year 953; Phillimore's reconstruction of the latter's dating would place it in 956.

See also
 Kings of Wales family trees

References  

900s deaths
Monarchs of Powys
House of Aberffraw
Welsh princes
9th-century Welsh monarchs
Year of birth missing
Year of death uncertain